Eugen Carpov (born 22 April 1966) is a diplomat and politician from Moldova. He was the Deputy Prime Minister for Reintegration of the Republic of Moldova from 14 January 2011 to 10 December 2014 (Second Vlad Filat Cabinet).

Between 2002 and 2005 he was Ambassador of the Republic of Moldova in Poland, and between 2005 and 2007 he was Ambassador and Head of Mission of the Mission of the Republic of Moldova to the European Union.

On 27 February 2015 Eugen Carpov announced that he was leaving the LDPM faction in parliament, remaining an independent deputy. In the Leancă Cabinet he was a technocrat Deputy Prime Minister, not formally affiliated politically. Also, in the 2014 parliamentary elections in the Republic of Moldova, he was included in the list of LDPM candidates on the 9th position, becoming a deputy in the newly elected parliament, but not being a party member.

References

External links 
 Deputy Prime Minister, Eugen Carpov

Living people
1966 births
People from Ungheni
Moldovan diplomats
Moldova State University alumni
Deputy Prime Ministers of Moldova
National University of Political Studies and Public Administration alumni
Ambassadors of Moldova to the European Union
Ambassadors of Moldova to Poland